Sarv Kani (also Romanized as Sarv Kānī, Sarūkānī, and Seroukani) is a village in Lahijan-e Sharqi Rural District, Lajan District, Piranshahr County, West Azerbaijan Province, Iran. At the 2006 census, its population was 1,250, in 208 families.

References 

Populated places in Piranshahr County